Moosonee is a town in northern Ontario, Canada, on the Moose River approximately  south of James Bay. It is considered to be "the Gateway to the Arctic" and has Ontario's only saltwater port. Nearby on Moose Factory Island is the community of Moose Factory to which it is connected by water taxi in the summer and ice road in the winter.

There is no road connection to the community but flights are provided by Air Creebec and by Thunder Airlines. Moosonee is also the railhead of the Ontario Northland Railway where goods are transferred to barges and aircraft for transport to more northerly communities. Moosonee is not particularly far north, being located at 51°N—which is roughly the same latitude as Saskatoon, Calgary, London (UK), and Berlin—but is colder due to its proximity to Hudson Bay, and isolated due to its lack of road access to the rest of Ontario. The community was the site of a fur trading post set up in 1903 by Revillon Frères, competitors to the Hudson's Bay Company which later bought out Révillon.

Moosonee formerly held the status of a development area, the only community in the province with that designation, and was governed by a locally elected board subject to formal appointment by the Ontario provincial government. It became incorporated as a town effective January 1, 2001, with an elected mayor and four-person council.

History

In 1900, Annie Hardisty and her two daughters were the first settlers on the site. Significant development began on June 6, 1903, four canoes and a crew of 21 persons of the Révillon Frères company arrived on the banks of the Moose River near the much older Moose Factory to establish the Moose River Post. This Parisian furrier had ambitious plans to set up a chain of fur trading posts in direct competition with the Hudson's Bay Company, including five on James Bay. But it suffered a setback when their supply ship that carried all the provisions shipwrecked near Fort George. The Revillon Frères Museum is located on First Street.

Moose River Post became the most important location for Révillon Frères and was quickly expanded with a staff house, carpenter's shop, warehouse, and sawmill. The buildings were spaced far apart as a preventive measure to minimize the spread of fire. By 1912, it was reported that "the whole line of good substantial buildings, built principally for their French Canadian employees, stretches along the river front for nearly a mile northward from the residence of the inspector."

Moose River Post (and Moose Factory) were prosperous but isolated. It was supplied only once per year by ship coming from Montreal around the Labrador Peninsula. Mail arrived only four times per year, twice by canoe and twice by toboggan. During World War I, Révillon Frères' chartered supply ship was requisitioned for war service. So from then on until 1932, the post was supplied by scows from Pagwa on the National Transcontinental Railway coming down the Pagwachuan, Kenogami, and Albany Rivers.

In 1932, the Temiskaming and Northern Ontario Railway was extended from Cochrane to Moose River Post, that was renamed at that time to Moosonee, derived from the Cree word  meaning "at the Moose [River]". In 1936, Révillon Frères sold its Canadian operations to the Hudson's Bay Company and the Moosonee post closed. The HBC also exited the fur trade and opened a retail store in Moosonee (now Northern Store part of The North West Company). With the end of the fur trade business, Moosonee's economy became centred on transportation.

In 1962, Moosonee became the site of RCAF Station Moosonee that was part of NORAD's Pinetree Line chain of radar stations. It closed in 1975 and some of its buildings were used by the Town after the closure, including the base swimming pool and recreation centre.

In 1968, the town was classified as a development area board. In November 2000, it was incorporated as the Town of Moosonee.

The most recent municipal council was elected on October 27, 2014, and three replacement councillors were elected in a by-election held on July 7, 2015. For 2014–2018, the town council consisted of mayor Wayne Taipale, and councillors Tony Tourville, John Moore, Carman Tozer and Cathy Turner.

Demographics

In 2011, mother tongue was 79.3% English, 17.7% Cree, 1.8% French, and 1.2% other language.

Services
Moosonee has two elementary schools, Moosonee Public School and Bishop Belleau Separate School (Roman Catholic) that offer kindergarten through grade eight. Bishop Belleau School also provides a French Language Instructional Unit for children who are entitled to be educated in French. There is a public high school, Northern Lights Secondary School, that provides grades nine through twelve. Northern College's Moosonee campus provides some post-secondary programs.

Health services are provided through the Moosonee Health Clinic of the Weeneebayko Area Health Authority (merger of the former James Bay General Hospital and the Weeneebayko Health Ahtuskaywin which operated Weeneebayko General Hospital in Moose Factory).

Payukotayno (pronounced pay-k-ta-no) Family Services provide child care and social assistance to Moosonee, Moose Factory, Attawapiskat First Nation, Fort Albany, Kashechewan and Peawanuck. Payukotayno is a recognized Ontario Children's Aid Society and means 'one family' in Cree.

As of 2020 a "satellite Trades Centre" was being operated in the community by Northern College "linked to the ... Timmins Campus"; courses included technology, trades and apprenticeship programs.

Climate
Moosonee has a humid continental climate (Köppen climate classification Dfb) with subarctic influences, which gives the town warm summers and cold winters, sometimes severe. James Bay acts as a thermal reservoir to moderate spring and fall temperatures. Spring break-up, or spring thaw, usually occurs in April. Precipitation is somewhat higher in summer than at other times of the year. Severe thunderstorms can occur from time to time.

Transportation
The town is billed as "a major transportation hub for Ontario’s Far North".

As of 2020, the MV Niska 1 ferry was operating between Moosonee and Moose Factory island, carrying passengers and vehicles.

Moosonee Station and Yard

The main method of access is by Ontario Northland Railway which reached the town in 1932 and which provides passenger and freight train service to Cochrane. Ontario Northland's Polar Bear Express train runs from Moosonee station to Cochrane six days per week during the summer months and five days per week during the rest of the year. Moosonee Station is located at the end of First Street and has a small station building, freight shed, diesel shed and an outdoor yard to store trains. Tickets are sold by phone or at the offices Cochrane, Ontario, Moosonee, Moose Factory and Timmins. The train will stop on demand in some locations as part of the flag stop service. No meal service is available on this train.

There are also two freight trains per week. During the summer and early fall shipping season, goods can be transported from Moosonee by barge. In January 2007, responsibility for the Port of Moosonee was transferred from the federal government to the Town of Moosonee. The Polar Bear Express Passenger Train transports cars, canoes, ATVs, and snowmobiles as long as they are booked in advance notice. It is one of only two motorail services in North America.

Airport
The town is also accessible via the Moosonee Airport, served with scheduled flights of Air Creebec, Moosonee Water Aerodrome and cargo service through North Star Air.

Roads
Moosonee is inaccessible by road. During the early months of 2008, a winter road was open between Moosonee and the provincial road system at Otter Rapids. This road was built to support the twinning of the electric transmission lines that run from Otter Rapids to Moosonee. Local residents report it taking five or six hours to get to Timmins from Moosonee via Otter Rapids and Smooth Rock Falls. This road was not in service in 2009. In late 2009, members of the Moose Cree First Nation voted for the construction of a seasonal winter road south to Otter Rapids.

During the winter, ice roads are plowed and maintained on the ice across the Moose River to Moose Factory and winter roads are maintained to the coastal communities of Fort Albany, Kashechewan and Attawapiskat. In recent years, much of the traffic heading up north has been destined for the Victor Diamond Mine operated by De Beers Canada to the west of Attawapiskat.

In January 2021, the  James Bay Winter Ice Road was under construction, to connect Attawapiskat, Kashechewan, Fort Albany and Moosonee. It opened some time in winter 2021 and was said to accept loads up to 50,000 kilograms in weight. The road was operated by Kimesskanemenow LP, "a limited partnership between the four communities it connects".

Feasibility studies have been undertaken on the construction of a permanent all-season road to the communities of Moosonee, Fort Albany, Kashechewan and Attawapiskat River. The project, if undertaken, will entail a "coastal road" connecting the four communities with each other, as well as a road to link the coastal road to the provincial highway system at Fraserdale, Kapuskasing or Hearst.

Communications
Moosonee has a local radio station, CHMO 1450 AM, that is generally operated by volunteers, plus a rebroadcasting facility for CBC Radio One Northern Ontario from CBCS-FM Sudbury on 1340 AM. Most homes subscribe to either Creecable cable TV or a satellite TV service to receive their programming, following the 2012 closure of the local CBC Television and TVOntario repeaters.

Ontera, formerly Ontario Northland Telecommunications, but now owned by Bell, provides telecommunications service in Moosonee (NPA-NXX 705-336).

Attractions and tourism
Tourism agencies recommend the Polar Bear Express as a "great rail excursion" in summer, between Cochrane and Moosonee, to view the "hydroelectric dams, isolated homes and perhaps even some wildlife."  No meal service is available on this train.

A private company offers freighter-canoe ferry across the Moose River to Moose Factory where Centennial Park exhibits 19th-century buildings from the fur-trading era.

Notable attractions in Moosonee include:
 Railway Car Museum – displaying the cultural history of the area in an old Baggage Car of the Temiskaming & Northern Ontario Railway.
 MNR Interpretive Centre – displays and videos at the office of the Ministry of Natural Resources highlighting the wildlife, geological, and geographical features of the region.
 Excursions to the bird sanctuaries of Shipsands Island and the Southern James Bay.

The Tidewater Provincial Park is on nearby Charles Island, adjacent to Moose Factory Island.

References

Footnotes

External links

 
1903 establishments in Ontario
Hudson's Bay Company trading posts
Municipalities in Cochrane District
Populated coastal places in Canada
Road-inaccessible communities of Ontario
Single-tier municipalities in Ontario
Towns in Ontario